Ujeon, also called cheonmul-cha, refers to nokcha (green tea) made of young, tender leaves and buds hand-plucked before gogu ("grain rain", 20–21 April).

Korean ujeon is equivalent to Chinese mingqian ("pre-Qingming") and Japanese shincha ("new tea").

References 

Green tea
Korean tea